The Immaculate Conception Cathedral Also Concepción Cathedral Is the name that receives a religious building affiliated with the Catholic Church that is located in the city of Concepción in Santa Cruz Department, Bolivia.

The complex includes the cathedral the bell tower and the parochial house that were built by the Jesuits between 1753 and 1756. It was declared a national monument of Bolivia in 1950 and a World Heritage Site by Unesco in 1990.

Administration
The temple follows the Roman or Latin rite and is the main church of the Apostolic Vicariate of Ñuflo de Chávez (Apostolicus Vicariatus Niuflensis) that was created in 1951 through the bull "Ne sacri Pastores" of Pope Pius XII.

It is under the pastoral responsibility of Bishop Bonifacio Antonio Reimann Panic.

See also

Roman Catholicism in Bolivia
Immaculate Conception Cathedral 
 List of Jesuit sites

References

Roman Catholic cathedrals in Bolivia
Roman Catholic churches completed in 1756
18th-century Roman Catholic church buildings in Bolivia
Jesuit Missions of Chiquitos